WETV-CD, virtual and VHF digital channel 11, was a low-power, Class A independent television station licensed to Murfreesboro, Tennessee, United States. Owned by The Rutherford Group, it was sister to radio station WGNS (1450 AM). WETV-CD's transmitter was located at the intersection of Broad and Church streets in Murfreesboro, sharing tower space with WGNS.

History
The station began broadcasting on September 5, 1985, and had been simulcasting sister radio station WGNS ever since.

During times when syndicated programming was on the air, the station transmitted data from its weather station with WGNS' program audio playing in the background.

At times of local programming, one could see shots of the studio and respective hosts. When viewers tuned to channel 11, they saw the host and his or her guests in the studio, while the radio show was in progress. This technique was also used for the televised versions of Howard Stern and Don Imus' radio shows.

The Federal Communications Commission (FCC) canceled WETV-CD's license on August 3, 2021, due to the station's owners failing to file an application to renew the license prior to its August 1 expiration date.

Technical information

Subchannel

Analog-to-digital conversion
From WETV's sign on of September 5, 1985 to September 1, 2015, the station broadcast in analog at 61 watts, WETV was then approved to "flash-cut" the channel 11 frequency to digital, with a power increase to 300 watts, as this was done on September 1, 2015. However at the same time, WETV ceased broadcasting of its analog signal, as it turned on its digital signal.

References

ETV-CD
Television channels and stations established in 1992
1992 establishments in Tennessee
Low-power television stations in the United States
Independent television stations in the United States
Murfreesboro, Tennessee
Defunct television stations in the United States
Television channels and stations disestablished in 2021
2021 disestablishments in Tennessee
ETV-CD